Montsauche-les-Settons is a commune in the Nièvre department in the region of Bourgogne-Franche-Comté in central France. Montsauche-les Settons is completely rural, the commune composed of a settlement, half of Lac des Settons (lake), and a few dispersed hamlets.

Geography 

The commune of Montsauche-les Settons is centrally located in Bourgogne-Franche-Comté in the Morvan mountainous massif, at the heart of the protected natural area of the Parc naturel régional du Morvan.

The settlement, located 3 km from the lake, contains all the businesses and essential services of the area. The lake area's economy is organized around tourism, while the principal economic activity of the surrounding hamlets is raising cattle and Christmas tree farming.

The associated historical place names of the area are:

Bordering Communes

See also
Communes of the Nièvre department
Parc naturel régional du Morvan

References

Communes of Nièvre